Key White (born June 8, 2001) is an American professional soccer player who plays as a forward for North Carolina Tar Heels.

Career

Youth
White playing with Richmond United from 2015, before signing for USL League One side Richmond Kickers on July 12, 2019, on an academy contract to preserve his college eligibility.

College
White began playing college soccer at the University of North Carolina at Chapel Hill in 2019.

References

2001 births
Living people
American soccer players
Association football forwards
Richmond Kickers players
North Carolina Tar Heels men's soccer players
Soccer players from Virginia
USL League One players